Larry Farmer (born 20 February 1942) is a professor of law at the J. Reuben Clark Law School at Brigham Young University in Provo, Utah.  He is also noted for pioneering the method of document assembly.

Career 
Farmer has a bachelor's degree from the University of Washington.  He received his Ph.D. in clinical psychology from Brigham Young University in 1975.  He is an expert in legal counseling.  He has been a member of the Clark Law School faculty since 1974 and has also been a visiting professor at Harvard Law School.

Sources 
 
list of J. Reuben Clark Law School faculty

1942 births
Living people
Brigham Young University faculty
University of Washington alumni
Brigham Young University alumni
Harvard Law School faculty
American legal scholars